Karu Diddina Kapuram is a 1986 Indian Telugu-language comedy film, produced by Ramoji Rao under the Usha Kiran Movies banner and directed by D. V. Narasa Raju. It stars Nutan Prasad, Rajendra Prasad, Rama Prabha and Pavithra, with music composed by Satyam.

Plot
Engineer Raghava Rao (Nutan Prasad) and his wife Indumathi (Rama Prabha) have three daughters who are married. Raghava Rao has the life ambition to buy a car and finally, he succeeds in buying a rebuilt secondhand foreign car which has been damaged in an accident. Shockingly, the car contains the aura of original owner Ram Swamy, who had died in the accident next day after purchase. As his desire on the car is not fulfilled, his aura is left back on the earth which drives the car automatically, makes so many magics and sets right the problems of Raghava Rao. At last, Raghava Rao takes care of Ram Swamy's family, showing his gratitude. Finally, Ram Swamy's aura is completely satisfied, leaves the car and mingles into the universe.

Cast

Nutan Prasad as Engineer Raghava Rao
Rajendra Prasad as Satya Keerthi David
Nagesh as Pulla Rao 
Padmanabham as Saree Seller
Suthi Velu as Manmadha Rao
Shankar Melkote as New Engineer
Mada as Seth Kishanlal
Ali as Paper Boy
Vidyasagar as Mechanic Kanakaiah
Tilak as Subbaiah
Potti Prasad as Traffic Constable
Mithai Chitti as Astrologer 
Chidatala Appa Rao as Police Inspector
Satti Babu as Priest
Dham as Mechanic 
Jenny as Doctor 
Rama Prabha as Indumathi
Pavithra as Suguna Sundari
Srilakshmi as Hema Sundari
Sangeeta as Ram Swamy's wife
Mamatha as Pullamma 
Disco Shanti as Steno
Shilpa
Sri Sailaja as Rupa Sundari 
Chelakala Radha as Servant
Kalpana Rai as Seth Kishanlal's wife 
Y. Vijaya as Rupa Sundari's mother-in-law

Soundtrack

Music composed by Satyam. Lyrics were written by Veturi. Music released on Mayuri Audio Company.

References

Indian comedy films
Films scored by Satyam (composer)
1980s Telugu-language films
1986 comedy films
1986 films